The 31st Vanier Cup was played on November 25, 1995, at the SkyDome in Toronto, Ontario, and decided the CIAU football champion for the 1995 season. The Calgary Dinos won their fourth championship by defeating the Western Mustangs by a score of 54-24.

References

External links
 Official website

Vanier Cup
Vanier Cup
1995 in Toronto
November 1995 sports events in Canada